Ersi may refer to:
 Ersi, Jolfa, East Azerbaijan Province
 Ersi, Marand, East Azerbaijan Province
 Ersi, West Azerbaijan
 Ersi Rural District, in East Azerbaijan Province